The Museum of Modern Art in Ljubljana, Slovenia, is the central museum and gallery of the Slovenian art works from the 20th and 21st centuries.

History
Established by decree of the government of the People's Republic of Slovenia on 30 December 1947, and officially opened to the public on 3 January 1948, it houses a permanent collection of 21st century Slovenian art as well as art from foreign artists. Its central building was designed by Edvard Ravnikar and was built in 1948. In addition, it acts as a place for: debate, documentation, education, research and study, increasing the presence of art for the wider public. The museum seeks to build a divergent model of museum, open the dialogue between institutes following similar priorities and those which are building new cultural production models.

On 26 November 2011, it was expanded with the Metelkova Museum of Contemporary Art, situated at Metelko Street.

See also
National Gallery of Slovenia
Art of Slovenia

References

External links
 Museum of Modern Art, official website
 

Art museums and galleries in Ljubljana
Art museums established in 1947
1947 establishments in Slovenia
Edvard Ravnikar